Arnala Fort is built on a small island off the port town of Arnala, located around 13 km (8 miles) north of Bassein, Maharashtra, India. Being an island fort, it is also called Jaldurg or Janjire-Arnala. The Portuguese, who built the present fort, called the island Ilha das Vacas (Island of Cows).

History 

The island of Arnala, which has water on all four sides, belonged to Sultan Mahmud Begda of Gujarat.

The island was conquered by the Portuguese in 1530.

In 1737, after nearly two hundred years of Portuguese rule, the fort came under the control of the Marathas in 1737.

The fort was rebuilt by the first Bajirao.

In the middle of 1817, the fort came under the control of the British

In 1516 a local chieftain in Gujarat, Sultan Mahmud Begda, constructed the fort on the island, strategically located at the mouth of the Vaitarna river. In the 1530s the Portuguese had established their operations in the coastal area, headquartered at Fort Bassein, and soon gained control of the island. The Portuguese captain of Bassein donated the island to a Portuguese nobleman who tore down the old fort and began construction of a  fort. The nobleman never completed the fort. Still, it remained under Portuguese control for two centuries; they used it to control shipping and navigation along the northern Konkan coast.

During the late 17th and early 18th centuries, after a long struggle with the Mughal Empire, the Maratha Confederacy came to dominate the region. In 1737 the then Peshwa Baji Rao I sent his brother, Chimaji Appa, to take the Bassein Fort from the Portuguese. After winning the Battle of Vasai, his general, Shankarji Pant, persuaded Chimaji to launch an assault on Fort Arnala, for its strategic importance to the Maratha navy in assaulting Portuguese interests. Their first assault, coordinated with a Maratha naval force commanded by Govindji kasar & Manaji Agre, was routed by a superior Portuguese naval force. A second assault on the fort on 28 March 1737, caught the Portuguese by surprise and forced them to abandon the fort. The victory was commemorated by a plaque installed on the northern wall of the fort and is still visible today. The Marathas then rebuilt the fort, constructing three bastions Bahirav, Bhavani, and Bava.

The British captured the fort on 18 January 1781 during the First Anglo-Maratha War. The Treaty of Salbai nominally returned the Arnala and Bassien forts to the Marathas. The Marathas controlled the fort until 1817.

During the Third Anglo-Maratha War, despite painstakingly defending the fort, the Marathas were finally forced to surrender the fort to the superior naval power of the British. The British formally regained the forts under the Treaty of Poona.

Today the fort is in a state of disrepair.

Features

Water Reservoir and Shrines 
There is a large octagonal fresh water reservoir inside the fort.
Within its walls, are also the temples of Ambakeshwar, Bhavani and Shiva as well as Dargas (tombs) of Shah Ali and Hajji Ali. The 'paduka' or sacred sandals of Shrinity Anand are housed in a dome on the eastern face of the fort.

The Entrance 
The main entrance of the fort faces approximately north. 
The solid stone doorway is adorned with pictures of tigers and elephants.

Ramparts and Walls 
The external ramparts are in a fairly good condition, and a roughly three-meter-wide path exists along the outer walls.
.

Southern Watch Tower
There exists a lone Martello tower about 550 meters from the main fort, on the southern end of the island. This tower has no entrance gate.

See also 

Bassein Fort
Portuguese India
List of forts in Maharashtra

References

External links 

 Arnala Fort Pictures  Pictures of Forts in Maharashtra
  Arnala Fort Page A Vasai Cultural Information Website in GeoCities.
 Arnala fort Trip A Blog Post on Arnala by a blogger.
 Arnala Fort & Jivdani Temple - * How to go, places to visit, things to do
 Trekking Tourism - Virar - विरार - ویرار

Maratha Navy
Arnala
Portuguese forts in India
History of Vasai
Rebuilt buildings and structures in India
16th-century forts in India
1530s establishments in Portuguese India
Tourist attractions in Palghar district
Forts in Maharashtra